The One Above All, the End of All That Is is the second and final release by the American metalcore band Curl Up and Die.

Track listing 
"An Uncomfortable Routine" – 4:54
"Antidepressants Are Depressing" – 0:56
"Ultra Carb Diet Carpooling Stupid Fucking Life" – 1:23
"The One Above All, the End of All That Is" – 0:38
"Instrumental" – 3:52
"Black Out" – 4:47
"There Ain't No Can't in American" – 1:14
"Zero MPH Fallover" – 0:51
"There Is Never Enough Time to Do Nothing" – 3:37
"I'm Trying to Fly to the Moon Using Two Magnets and Willpower" – 5:18
"Blood Mosh Hips Hair Lips Pills Fuck Death" – 6:16

Personnel 
Jesse Fitts – drums
Matt Fuchs – guitar
Ryan Hartery – bass guitar
Mike Minnick – vocals

Additional
Alex Newport – engineering and mixing
Alan Douches – mastering
Dave Gorum – artwork and design

External links 
Revelation Records REV 126 | Curl Up and Die – The One Above All, the End of All That Is

2005 albums
Curl Up and Die albums
Revelation Records albums